RC Soignies is a Belgian rugby union club currently competing in the Belgian Elite League.

The club is based in Soignies in Hainaut.
The official colours of the club are green and white.

History
The club was founded in 1973 and has never won the Belgian Elite League but recently won the Belgian Cup for the first time.

In 2015, RC Soignies were beaten by a record 356-3 by Royal Kituro.  The referee for the fixture arrived over an hour after the scheduled start time, during this period, most of the Soignies players left as they believed the match had been cancelled.  The remaining players seemingly allowed the Kituro players to run unchallenged to score 56 tries and 38 conversions as a protest.

Honours

 Belgian Cup
 Champions: 2010
 Belgian 2nd Division
 Champions: 1979
 Belgian Super Cup
 Champions 2010

See also
 Rugby union in Belgium
 Belgian Elite League
 Belgian Cup (Rugby Union)

References

External links
 Official site

Belgian rugby union clubs